This page lists notable sports alumni and students of the University of California, Berkeley.

Baseball
 Geoff Blum – professional baseball player with the Houston Astros
 Brennan Boesch – professional baseball player with the New York Yankees
 Allen Craig (born 1984) – professional baseball player with the Boston Red Sox
 Mike Epstein (born 1943) – professional baseball player
 Brian Horwitz (born 1982) – professional baseball player
 Conor Jackson – professional baseball player with the Boston Red Sox
 Brett Jackson – 1st Round of MLB 2009 Draft – MLB Chicago Cubs/ Arizona Diamondbacks 
 Jackie Jensen – professional baseball player 1958 AL MVP Boston Red Sox
 Erik Johnson – drafted in 2011 by the Chicago White Sox
 Jeff Kent – professional baseball player with the Los Angeles Dodgers; 2000 NL MVP (SF Giants)
 Andrew Knapp (born 1991) – catcher for the Philadelphia Phillies
 Darren Lewis (born 1967) – OF for the San Francisco Giants and the Boston Red Sox
 Kevin Maas (born 1965) – 1B and DH for the New York Yankees
 Bob Melvin (born 1961) – MLB player and manager
 Brandon Morrow – professional pitcher for the Chicago Cubs
 Xavier Nady – MLB player for the Arizona Diamondbacks
 Tyson Ross – professional pitcher for the San Diego Padres
 Josh Satin (born 1984) – professional baseball player with the New York Mets
 Marcus Semien – professional baseball player for the Oakland Athletics
 Andrew Vaughn – professional baseball player for the Chicago White Sox, 3rd overall pick in 2019
 Tyler Walker (born 1976) – professional baseball player (previously for Washington Nationals)

Basketball
Jaylen Brown – No.3 pick in the 2016 NBA Draft, NBA player for Boston Celtics, a 2021 NBA All-Star
Shareef Abdur-Rahim – retired professional (NBA) basketball player
Ryan Anderson – 1st round (21st overall) of the 2008 NBA draft, played for the New Orleans Pelicans and Houston Rockets
Rod Benson (born 1984) – D-league standout
Brittany Boyd – 1st round (9th overall) of the 2015 WNBA draft; currently plays for New York Liberty
Geno Carlisle (born 1976)
Layshia Clarendon – 1st round (9th overall) of 2013 WNBA draft; currently plays for Indiana Fever
Allen Crabbe – 31st overall pick in 2013 by Cleveland Cavaliers and played for the Portland Trail Blazers and Brooklyn Nets
Francisco Elson – 2007 NBA Champion with the San Antonio Spurs; currently playing in Iran
Larry Friend – 2nd round (13th overall) of the 1957 draft
 Shahar Gordon (born 1980) – Israeli played in the Israel Basketball Premier League and for the Israeli national basketball team
Ed Gray – 1st round (22nd overall) of the 1997 draft to Atlanta Hawks
Chuck Hanger – 2nd round (9th overall) of the 1948 BAA draft
Devon Hardin – 2nd round (50th overall) of the 2008 NBA draft
Darrall Imhoff – 1st round (3rd overall) of the 1960 draft (all-star)
Kevin Johnson, B.A. 1997 – retired professional NBA basketball player; 2008–2016 mayor of Sacramento
Harper Kamp – Basketball-Bundesliga Germany player for BG Göttingen
Jason Kidd – retired professional NBA basketball player; Pac-12 Player of the Year; nine-time NBA All Star; 2011 NBA Champions; head coach from 2014 to 2018 of the Milwaukee Bucks
Sean Lampley (born 1979)
Sean Marks, B.A. 1998 – formerly played for the New Orleans Hornets, 
Mark McNamara – 1st round (22nd overall) of the 1982 NBA Draft
Lamond Murray – former NBA forward who most recently played for the New Jersey Nets
Leon Powe – drafted in 2006 by Denver Nuggets and played for the Boston Celtics
Ivan Rabb – 2nd round (35th overall) of the 2017 NBA Draft by the Orlando Magic and played for the Memphis Grizzlies 
Jamal Sampson – professional basketball player currently playing for Denver Nuggets
D. J. Seeley (born 1989) – basketball player for Maccabi Tel Aviv of the Israeli Premier League and the Euroleague
 Sam Singer (born 1995) – American-Israeli basketball player for Israeli team Bnei Herzliya
Amit Tamir (born 1979) – pro basketball player (Hapoel Jerusalem)
Ashley Walker – 1st round (12th overall) of 2009 WNBA draft
Tyrone Wallace – 2nd round (60th overall) of 2016 NBA Draft currently playing for Los Angeles Clippers

Football

Chidi Ahanotu – 12-year NFL veteran DE
Keenan Allen – 76th pick in the 2013 NFL Draft for the San Diego Chargers
Tyson Alualu – defensive tackle for the Jacksonville Jaguars, #10 overall NFL draft pick in 2010
C. J. Anderson – running back for the Los Angeles Rams
Bryan Anger – 70th pick in the 2012 NFL Draft for the Jacksonville Jaguars
Marc Anthony – 247th pick in the 2013 NFL Draft for the Baltimore Ravens
J.J. Arrington – NFL running back for the Arizona Cardinals
Nnamdi Asomugha, B.A. 2003 – NFL All-Pro cornerback for the Philadelphia Eagles
Troy Auzenne – BA 1992, Cal Hall of Fame offensive tackle for the Chicago Bears and Indianapolis Colts
Joe Ayoob – former Cal quarterback, current world paper airplane record holder
Tully Banta-Cain – linebacker for the New England Patriots and San Francisco 49ers
Steve Bartkowski – NFL QB, #1 overall NFL draft pick of 1975, NFL Rookie of the Year, two-time Pro Bowler
Jahvid Best – running back for the Detroit Lions, #30 overall NFL draft pick in 2010
David Binn – 1995 NFL longsnapper with the San Diego Chargers
Desmond Bishop – NFL ILB Green Bay Packers #192 overall in 2007 Draft
Kyle Boller – quarterback for St. Louis Rams
Jim Breech- NFL kicker
Doug Brien – NFL kicker
D. J. Campbell − 216th pick in the 2012 NFL Draft for the Carolina Panthers
Dana Carey − professional football player in the first American Football League with the Los Angeles Wildcats in 1926
Andre Carter – defensive end for the Washington Redskins
Sean Cattouse – NFL player
Chris Conte – 93rd overall NFL draft pick in 2011 for the Chicago Bears
Joe Cooper – NFL player
Jake Curhan (born 1998) - American football offensive tackle for the Seattle Seahawks of the National Football League (NFL)
Sean Dawkins – wide receiver for the Indianapolis Colts
 Brian de la Puente (born 1985) – NFL player
Thomas DeCoud – NFL Safety with the Atlanta Falcons
Ralph DeLoach – American football player
Dameane Douglas - American football player. Played for the Philadelphia Eagles from 1999 to 2002.
Terrance Dotsy – American football player
Herm Edwards – former cornerback for the Philadelphia Eagles, current head coach at Arizona State
Jack Evans – quarterback for the Green Bay Packers
Zack Follett – linebacker for the Detroit Lions
Justin Forsett – NFL running back for the Baltimore Ravens
Scott Fujita, B.A. 2001, M.A. 2002 – linebacker for the Cleveland Browns
Derrick Gardner – American football player
Mike Gibson – 184th pick in the 2008 NFL Draft for the Philadelphia Eagles
Tarik Glenn, B.A. 1999 – former offensive tackle for Indianapolis Colts, Super Bowl XLI champion
Jared Goff – number 1 overall draft pick in the 2016 NFL draft; quarterback; taken by the Los Angeles Rams
Tony Gonzalez – Pro Football Hall of Fame tight end for the Kansas City Chiefs and Atlanta Falcons, also played basketball at Berkeley
Trevor Guyton − 219th pick in the 2012 NFL Draft for the Minnesota Vikings
Chris Harper – wide receiver for the New England Patriots
Nick Harris – punter for the Detroit Lions
Ken Harvey – linebacker for the Phoenix Cardinals and Washington Redskins
Steve Hendrickson – LB and special teams player for the San Diego Chargers
Daymeion Hughes – NFL CB Indianapolis Colts #95 overall in 2007 Draft
Darryl Ingram – former NFL player
DeSean Jackson – NFL wide receiver for the Tampa Bay Buccaneers
Marvin Jones −166th pick in the 2012 NFL Draft for the Cincinnati Bengals
Cameron Jordan – 24th overall of the 2nd round of the NFL draft pick in 2011 for the New Orleans Saints
Joe Kapp, B.A. 1960 – quarterback in the CFL and for the Minnesota Vikings
Keala Keanaaina – American football fullback
Mychal Kendricks – 46th pick in the 2012 NFL Draft for the Philadelphia Eagles
 Perry Klein (born 1971) – American football quarterback in the National Football League; played for the Atlanta Falcons
Jordan Kunaszyk – first team All-Pac-12 Conference and second team All-America by Sports Illustrated - Linebacker for the Carolina Panthers and Washington Football Team
L. P. Ladouceur – B.A. 2004 – NFL long snapper with the Dallas Cowboys
Ryan Longwell – B.A. 1997 – NFL kicker with the Minnesota Vikings
Marshawn Lynch – NFL running back Seattle Seahawks #12 overall in 2007 Draft
Alex Mack – NFL center for the Cleveland Browns #21 overall in 2009 Draft
Brandon Mebane – NFL DT Seattle Seahawks #85 overall in 2007 Draft
Dan Melville – punter for the San Francisco 49ers
Aaron Merz, B.A. 2005 – NFL guard for the Buffalo Bills
Mike Mohamed, B.A. 2010 – 189th overall NFL draft pick in 2011 for the Denver Broncos
Craig Morton – quarterback under Marv Levy and Bill Walsh; one of two quarterbacks to ever start the Super Bowl for two different teams
Harry Vance "Chuck" Muncie – NFL running back for the New Orleans Saints and the San Diego Chargers
Ryan O'Callaghan – NFL guard with the New England Patriots
Deltha O'Neal, B.A. 2000 – NFL cornerback with the Cincinnati Bengals
Jeremy Newberry – center for the Oakland Raiders
Hardy Nickerson, B.A. 1989 – All-Pro NFL linebacker
Doug Parrish, B.A 2016 – NFL defensive back and return specialist in the CFL 1993 Greycup Champion
Ken Pettway – American player of gridiron football
Marvin Philip – NFL lineman for the Pittsburgh Steelers
Bob Reinhard – AAFC and NFL player
Les Richter – Rams linebacker & kicker; 8 Pro Bowls, College Football HOF, Pro Football HOF, no. 2 overall NFL pick 1952
Ryan Riddle – NFL DE Oakland Raiders #212 overall in 2005 Draft, set single season sack record with 14.5 in the 2004 season
Roy Riegels – member of the Rose Bowl Hall of Fame, famed for 1929 Rose Bowl where he was dubbed "Wrong Way"
Ron Rivera – linebacker for the Chicago Bears and later head coach of the Carolina Panthers and Washington Redskins
Aaron Rodgers (class of 2004) – quarterback of the Green Bay Packers and regular season MVP when the Packers won the 2011 Super Bowl XLV, MVP of Super Bowl XLV
Joe Rose – tight end with the Miami Dolphins, 1980–1985; caught first touchdown pass of Pro Football Hall of Fame quarterback Dan Marino
Buck Saunders – blocking back for the Toledo Maroons
Mitchell Schwartz, 2011 – 37th pick in the 2012 NFL Draft for the Cleveland Browns, All-Pro for the Kansas City Chiefs
Brian Schwenke – 107th pick in the 2013 NFL Draft for the Tennessee Titans
Andrew L. Smith – Head Coach of the powerhouse Cal football teams of the 1920s
Byron Smith – NFL player
Todd Steussie – offensive lineman for the Minnesota Vikings, Carolina Panthers, and St. Louis Rams
John Sullivan – defensive back for the San Diego Chargers, Green Bay Packers, and San Francisco 49ers
Syd'Quan Thompson – cornerback for the Denver Broncos, #225 overall NFL draft pick in 2010
Bryce Treggs – NFL player
John Tuggle – running back for the New York Giants
Miles Turpin – linebacker for the Green Bay Packers and Tampa Bay Buccaneers
Iheanyi Uwaezuoke – former NFL wide receiver
Shane Vereen, B.A. 2010 – 56th overall NFL draft pick in 2011 for the New England Patriots
Wesley Walker – former NFL player
Tim Washington – defensive back for the San Francisco 49ers and Kansas City Chiefs
Ed White, B.A. 1968 – Cal Hall of Fame, All-Pro NFL offensive lineman for the Minnesota Vikings and San Diego Chargers
Josh White – American football player
Russell White, B.A. 1993 – Cal Hall of Fame running back for the Rams
Sherman White – defensive end for Cincinnati Bengals and Buffalo Bills; picked in the first round of the 1972 NFL draft
Sam Williams – NFL player
Steve Williams – 145th pick in the 2013 NFL Draft for the San Diego Chargers

Olympics

For a full list, see here.
 Nathan Adrian, B.A. 2012 – swimmer, eight-time Olympic-medalist, among the 10 most decorated Olympic swimmers of all time, winner of two gold medals and two bronze medals at the 2016 Summer Olympics in Rio de Janeiro, Brazil, winner of two gold medals and one silver medal at the 2012 Summer Olympics in London, England, winner of a gold medal at the 2008 Summer Olympics in Beijing, China
 Guy Barnea − Israeli Olympic swimmer
 Matt Biondi, B.A. 1988 – three-time Olympian, winner of eight gold medals
 Erin Cafaro, B.A. 2006 – Olympic crew, gold medalist at the 2008 Summer Olympics in Beijing, China and the 2012 Summer Olympics in London, England
 Hubert A. Caldwell, 1929 – Olympic crew, 1928 gold medalist
 Connie Carpenter-Phinney, B.A. 1981 – cycling gold medalist in 1984 Summer Olympics in Los Angeles, California
 Peter Cipollone, B.A. 1994 – coxswain for the gold medal-winning rowing team at the 2004 Summer Olympics in Athens, Greece
 Natalie Coughlin, B.A. 2005 – Olympic swimmer (winner of five medals, including two gold medals, at the 2004 Summer Olympics in Athens, Greece; at the 2008 Summer Olympics in Beijing, China, she became the first American female athlete to win six medals in one Olympics); three-time NCAA Swimmer of the Year
 Anthony Ervin – Olympic swimmer, has won four Olympic medals and two World Championship golds
 Joy Fawcett, B.A. 1992 – member of the gold winning United States women's soccer team at the 2004 Summer Olympics in Athens, and the 1996 Summer Olympics in Atlanta
 Missy Franklin, 2015 – 2012 Summer Olympic gold medalist
 Michele Granger, B.A. 1993 – softball pitcher and Olympic gold medalist
 Mark Henderson, 1991 – swimmer, gold medalist at the 1996 Summer Olympics where he broke the world record in the 400-meter medley swimming relay
 Burton Jastram, 1932 Olympic gold medalist in the Eights Competition
 Helene Mayer (1910–1953), German and American Olympic champion fencer
 Mary T. Meagher, B.A. 1987 – Olympic swimmer, winner of three gold medals; named one of CNNSI.com's 100 Greatest Women Athletes (ranked 17th)
 Alex Morgan, B.A. 2010 – National Women's Soccer League and United States women's national soccer team player (Orlando Pride), became the youngest player on the USWNT in the 2011 World Cup, gold medalist at the 2012 Summer Olympics
 Jonny Moseley, B.A. 2007 – gold medalist in 1998 Winter Olympics
 Heather Petri, B.S. 2002 – water polo player, gold medalist at the 2012 Summer Olympics in London, England
 Alvin F. Rylander, 1928 – Olympic crew, 1928 gold medalist
 Staciana Stitts, B.A. 2004 – Olympic swimmer, gold medalist in 2000 Summer Olympics in Sydney, Australia
 Dana Vollmer, B.A. 2009 – Olympic swimmer, gold medalist at the 2004 Summer Olympics in Athens, Greece, winner of three gold medals at the 2012 Summer Olympics in London, England
 Helen Wills, B.A. 1925 – tennis player; singles winner of eight Wimbledon titles, seven U.S. Open Championships, four French Opens, and two Olympic gold medals
 Elsie Windes, B.A. 2007 – water polo player, gold medalist at the 2012 Summer Olympics in London, England

Soccer

 Steve Birnbaum (born 1991) – Major League Soccer player
Servando Carrasco, 2010– professional soccer player for Fort Lauderdale CF
 Andrew Jacobson (born 1985) – Major League Soccer player
Leonard Krupnik, 2000 – Ukrainian-born American-Israeli professional soccer player for NY Red Bulls and Maccabi Haifa F.C., current soccer coach
Alex Morgan, B.A. 2011 – leader of the USWNT 2019 FIFA Women's World Cup team; professional player with Orlando Pride
Derek Van Rheenen, B.A. 1986, M.A. 1993, PhD 1997 – professional soccer player with San Francisco Bay Blackhawks, 1991 and 1993 All Star; on faculty
Sam Witteman – soccer player, National Women's Soccer League, Orlando Pride 
Peter Woodring, B.A. 1990 – professional soccer player in Europe and U.S., including Major League Soccer; played three games for the U.S. national team; currently Senior Vice President and Portfolio Manager at Cephus Capital Management

Tennis

 Doug Eisenman (born 1968) - tennis player
Helen Jacobs (1908–1997) – tennis player ranked world #1
Michael Russell – tennis player
Oskar Wikberg – tennis player

Other
Megan Cooke – professional rower
Mark Bingham – rugby player; foiled attempted hijacking of United Flight 93 during the September 11 attacks 
Shaney Fink – volleyball player and Athletic Director at Seattle University
Jolene Henderson – professional softball player
Max Homa – PGA Tour Pro golfer; 2013 NCAA champion; winner of the 2019 Wells Fargo Championship
 Erwin Klein (died 1992) – table tennis player
Bill Lester, B.S. 1984 – NASCAR driver, sixth African-American to start a NEXTEL Cup race
Kent Mitchell, Berkeley law degree 1965 – Olympic champion coxswain
Collin Morikawa, PGA Tour Pro; 2020 PGA Championship winner
Jacki Sorensen – inventor of aerobic dancing (aerobics)
Leigh Steinberg- B.A. 1970, J.D. 1973 – innovative sports agent, whose life story was fictionalized in the film Jerry Maguire; former UC student body president who wrangled with Ronald Reagan over the People's Park imbroglio
Allison Stokke Fowler – track and field athlete, female pole vaulter and fitness model, internet phenomenon.
Seth Stubblefield – swimmer

References

Sports
Berkeley alumni in sports
Alumni in sports